Haifa is the third-largest city in Israel—after Jerusalem and Tel Aviv—with a population of  in . The city of Haifa forms part of the Haifa metropolitan area, the third-most populous metropolitan area in Israel. It is home to the Baháʼí Faith's Baháʼí World Centre, and is a UNESCO World Heritage Site and a destination for Baháʼí pilgrimage.

Built on the slopes of Mount Carmel, the settlement has a history spanning more than 3,000 years. The earliest known settlement in the vicinity was Tell Abu Hawam, a small port city established in the Late Bronze Age (14th century BCE). In the 3rd century CE, Haifa was known as a dye-making center. Over the millennia, the Haifa area has changed hands: being conquered and ruled by the Canaanites, Israelites, Phoenicians, Assyrians, Babylonians, Persians, Hasmoneans, Romans, Byzantines, Arabs, Crusaders, Ottomans, and the British. Since the establishment of Israel in 1948, the Haifa Municipality has governed the city.

, the city is a major seaport located on Israel's Mediterranean coastline in the Bay of Haifa covering . Two respected academic institutions, the University of Haifa and the Technion – Israel Institute of Technology the oldest and top ranked university in both Israel and the Middle East, are located in Haifa, in addition to the largest K–12 school in Israel, the Hebrew Reali School. The city plays an important role in Israel's economy. It is home to Matam, one of the oldest and largest high-tech parks in the country; Haifa also owns the only underground rapid transit system located in Israel, known as the Carmelit. Haifa Bay is a center of heavy industry, petroleum refining and chemical processing. Haifa formerly functioned as the western terminus of an oil pipeline from Iraq via Jordan. It is one of Israel's mixed cities, with an Arab-Israeli population of c.10%.

Etymology

The ultimate origin of the name Haifa remains unclear. One theory holds it derives from the name of the high priest Caiaphas. Some Christians believe it was named for Saint Peter, whose Aramaic name was Keipha. Another theory holds it could be derived from the Hebrew verb root חפה (hafa), from H-f-h root (ח-פ-ה), meaning to cover or shield, i.e. Mount Carmel covers Haifa; others point to a possible origin in the Hebrew word חוֹף (hof), meaning "shore", or חוֹף יָפֶה (hof yafe), meaning "beautiful shore".

Other spellings in English included Caipha, Kaipha, Caiffa, Kaiffa and Khaifa.

Locations and names

Sycaminum and Efa
The earliest named settlement within the area of modern-day Haifa was a city known as Sycaminum. The remains of the ancient town can be found in a coastal tell, or archaeological mound, known in Hebrew as Tel Shikmona, meaning "mound of the Ficus sycomorus", and in Arabic as Tell el-Semak or Tell es-Samak, meaning "mound of the sumak trees", names that preserved and transformed the ancient name, by which the town is mentioned once in the Mishnah (composed c. 200 CE) for the wild fruits that grow around it.

The name Efa first appears during Roman rule, some time after the end of the 1st century, when a Roman fortress and small Jewish settlement were established not far from Tel Shikmona. Haifa is also mentioned more than 100 times in the Talmud, a work central to Judaism.

Hefa or Hepha in Eusebius of Caesarea's 4th-century work, Onomasticon (Onom. 108, 31), is said to be another name for Sycaminus. This synonymizing of the names is explained by Moshe Sharon, who writes that the twin ancient settlements, which he calls Haifa-Sycaminon, gradually expanded into one another, becoming a twin city known by the Greek names Sycaminon or Sycaminos Polis. References to this city end with the Byzantine period.

Porphyreon
Around the 6th century, Porphyreon or Porphyrea is mentioned in the writings of William of Tyre, and while it lies within the area covered by modern Haifa, it was a settlement situated south of Haifa-Sycaminon.

Early Muslim Haifa
Following the Arab conquest in the 7th century, Haifa was used to refer to a site established on Tel Shikmona upon what were already the ruins of Sycaminon (Shiqmona). Haifa (or Haifah) is mentioned by the mid-11th-century Persian chronicler Nasir Khusraw, and the 12th- and 13th-century Arab chroniclers, Muhammad al-Idrisi and Yaqut al-Hamawi. Nasir-i-Khusrau visited in 1047; he noted that "Haifa lies on the seashore, and there are here palm-gardens and trees in numbers. There are in this town shipbuilders, who build very large craft."

Crusader Caiphas
The Crusaders, who captured Haifa briefly in the 12th century, call it Caiphas, and believe its name related to Cephas, the Aramaic name of Simon Peter. Eusebius is also said to have referred to Hefa as Caiaphas civitas, and Benjamin of Tudela, the 12th-century Jewish traveller and chronicler, is said to have attributed the city's founding to Caiaphas, the Jewish high priest at the time of Jesus.

Late Ottoman "Old Haifa"
Haifa al-'Atiqa (Arabic: "Ancient Haifa") is another name used by some locals to refer to Tell es-Samak, when it was the site of Haifa while a hamlet of 250 residents, before it was moved in 1764–5 to the site from which the modern city emerged.

Haifa al-Jadida (New Haifa) and modern Haifa
In 1764-5 Zahir al-Umar moved the village to a new site  to the east, which he also fortified. The new village, the nucleus of modern Haifa, was first called al-imara al-jadida (Arabic: "the new construction") by some, but others residing there called it Haifa al-Jadida (Arabic: "New Haifa") at first, and then simply Haifa.

In the early 20th century, Haifa al 'Atiqa was repopulated with many Arab Christians in an overall neighborhood in which many Middle Eastern Jews were established inhabitants, as Haifa expanded outward from its new location.

History

Bronze Age: Tell Abu Hawam
A town known today as Tell Abu Hawam was established during the Late Bronze Age (14th century BCE). It was a port and fishing village.

In the Hebrew Bible
Mount Carmel and the Kishon River are mentioned in the Hebrew Bible.

A grotto on the top of Mount Carmel is known as the "Cave of Elijah", traditionally linked to the Prophet Elijah and his apprentice, Elisha. In Arabic, the highest peak of the Carmel range is called the Muhraka, or "place of burning," harking back to the burnt offerings and sacrifices there in Canaanite and early Israelite times.

Persian and Hellenistic period: near Shikmona
In the 6th century BCE, during the Persian period, Greek geographer Scylax wrote of a city "between the bay and the Promontory of Zeus" (i.e., the Carmel), which may be a reference to Shikmona, a locality in the Haifa area.

By Hellenistic times, the city had moved to a new site south of what is now the Bat Galim neighborhood of modern Haifa because the old port's harbour had become blocked with sand. A Greek-speaking population living along the coast at this time was engaged in commerce.

Shikmona
Haifa was located near the town of Shikmona, a center for making the traditional Tekhelet dye used in the garments of the high priests in the Temple. The archaeological site of Shikmona is southwest of Bat Galim.

Early Haifa is believed to have occupied the area which extends from the present-day Rambam Hospital to the Jewish Cemetery on Yafo Street. The inhabitants engaged in fishing and agriculture.

Roman period
In about the 3rd century CE, Haifa was first mentioned in Talmudic literature, as a Jewish fishing village and the home of Rabbi Avdimi and other Jewish scholars. According to the Talmud, fishermen caught Murex, sea snails which yielded purple dye used to make tallit (Jewish prayer shawls) from Haifa to the Ladder of the Tyrians. Tombs dating from the Roman era, including Jewish burial caves, have been found in the area.

Byzantine period
Under Byzantine rule, Haifa continued to grow but did not assume major importance. A kinah speaks of the destruction of the Jewish community of Haifa along with other communities when the Byzantines reconquered the country from the Sasanian Empire in 628 during the Byzantine-Sasanian War.

Early Muslim period
Following the Arab conquest of Palestine in the 630s-40s, Haifa was largely overlooked in favor of the port city of 'Akka. Under the Rashidun Caliphate, Haifa began to develop.

In the 9th century under the Umayyad and Abbasid Caliphates, Haifa established trading relations with Egyptian ports and the city featured several shipyards. The inhabitants, Arabs and Jews, engaged in trade and maritime commerce. Glass production and dye-making from marine snails were the city's most lucrative industries.

Crusader, Ayyubid and Mamluk rule

Prosperity ended in 1100 or 1101, when Haifa was besieged and blockaded by European Christians shortly after the end of the First Crusade, and then conquered after a fierce battle with its Jewish inhabitants and Fatimid garrison. Jews comprised the majority of the city's population at the time. Under the Crusaders, Haifa was reduced to a small fortified coastal stronghold. It was a part of the Principality of Galilee within the Kingdom of Jerusalem. Following their victory at the Battle of Hattin, Saladin's Ayyubid army captured Haifa in mid-July 1187 and the city's Crusader fortress was destroyed. The Crusaders under Richard the Lionheart retook Haifa in 1191.

In the 12th century religious hermits started inhabiting the caves on Mount Carmel, and in the 13th century they formed a new Catholic monastic order, the Carmelites. Under Muslim rule, the church which they had built on Mount Carmel was turned into a mosque, later becoming a hospital. In the 19th century, it was restored as a Carmelite monastery, the Stella Maris Monastery. The altar of the church as we see it today, stands over a cave associated with Prophet Elijah.
 
In 1265, the army of Mamluk sultan Baibars captured Haifa, destroying its fortifications, which had been rebuilt by King Louis IX of France, as well as the majority of the city's homes to prevent the European Crusaders from returning. From the time of its conquest by the Mamluks to the 15th century, Haifa was an unfortified small village or uninhabited. At various times there were a few Jews living there and both Jews and Christians made pilgrimages to the Cave of Elijah on Mount Carmel. During Mamluk rule in the 14th century, al-Idrisi wrote that Haifa served as the port for Tiberias and featured a "fine harbor for the anchorage of galleys and other vessels.

Ottoman period

Haifa was apparently uninhabited at the time the Ottoman Empire conquered Palestine in 1516. The first indication of its resettlement was given in a description by German traveller Leonhard Rauwolf, who visited Palestine in 1575. In 1596, Haifa appeared in Ottoman tax registers as being in the Nahiya of Sahil Atlit of the Liwa of Lajjun. It had a population of 32 Muslim households and paid taxes on wheat, barley, summer crops, olives, and goats or beehives. Haifa was subsequently mentioned in the accounts of travelers as a half-ruined impoverished village with few inhabitants. The expansion of commercial trade between Europe and Palestine in the 17th century saw Haifa's revival as a flourishing port as more ships began docking there rather than Acre.

In 1742, Haifa was a small village and had a Jewish community composed mainly of immigrants from Morocco and Algeria which had a synagogue. It had 250 inhabitants in 1764–5. It was located at Tell el-Semak, the site of ancient Sycaminum.

In 1765, Zahir al-Umar, the Arab ruler of Acre and the Galilee, moved the population to a new fortified site  to the east and laid waste to the old site. According to historian Moshe Sharon, the new Haifa was established by Zahir in 1769. This event marked the beginning of modern Haifa. After al-Umar's death in 1775, the town remained under Ottoman rule until 1918, with the exception of two brief periods.

In 1799, Napoleon Bonaparte conquered Haifa during his unsuccessful campaign to conquer Palestine and Syria, but he soon had to withdraw; in the campaign's final proclamation, Napoleon took credit for having razed the fortifications of "Kaïffa" (as the name was spelled at the time) along with those of Gaza, Jaffa and Acre.

Between 1831 and 1840, the Egyptian viceroy Muhammad Ali governed Haifa, after his son Ibrahim Pasha had wrested control over it from the Ottomans. When the Egyptian occupation ended and Acre declined, the importance of Haifa rose. In 1858, the walled city of Haifa was overcrowded and the first houses began to be built outside the city walls on the mountain slope. The British Survey of Western Palestine estimated Haifa's population to be about 3,000 in 1859.

Haifa remained majority Muslim throughout this time but a small Jewish community continued to exist there. In 1798, Rabbi Nachman of Breslov spent Rosh HaShana with the Jewish community of Haifa. In 1839 the Jewish population numbered 124. Due to the growing influence of the Carmelite monks, Haifa's Christian population also grew. By 1840 approximately 40% of the inhabitants were Christian Arabs.

The arrival of German messianics, many of whom were Templers, in 1868, who settled in what is now known as the German Colony, was a turning point in Haifa's development. The Templers built and operated a steam-based power station, opened factories and inaugurated carriage services to Acre, Nazareth and Tiberias, playing a key role in modernizing the city.

The first major wave of Jewish immigration to Haifa took place in the mid-19th century from Morocco, with a smaller wave of immigration from Turkey a few years later. In the 1870s, large numbers of Jewish and Arab migrants came to Haifa due to the town's growing prosperity. Jews constituted one-eighth of Haifa's population, almost all of whom were recent immigrants from Morocco and Turkey who lived in the Jewish Quarter, which was located in the eastern part of the town. Continued Jewish immigration gradually raised the Jewish population of Haifa, and included a small number of Ashkenazi families, most of whom opened hotels for Jewish migrants coming into the city. In 1875, the Jewish community of Haifa held its own census which counted the Jewish population at about 200. The First Aliyah of the late 19th century and the Second Aliyah of the early 20th century saw Jewish immigrants, mainly from Eastern Europe, arrive in Haifa in significant numbers. In particular, a significant number of Jewish immigrants from Romania settled in Haifa in the 1880s during the First Aliyah period. The Central Jewish Colonisation Society in Romania purchased over  near Haifa. As the Jewish settlers had been city dwellers, they hired the former fellahin tenants to instruct them in agriculture. The Jewish population rose from 1,500 in 1900 to 3,000 on the eve of World War I.

In 1909, Haifa became important to the Baháʼí Faith when the remains of the Báb, founder of the Bábí Faith and forerunner of Baháʼu'lláh in the Baháʼí Faith, were moved from Acre to Haifa and interred in the shrine built on Mount Carmel. Baháʼís consider the shrine to be their second holiest place on Earth after the Shrine of Baháʼu'lláh in Acre. Its precise location on Mount Carmel was shown by Baháʼu'lláh himself to his eldest son, ʻAbdu'l-Bahá, in 1891. ʻAbdu'l-Bahá planned the structure, which was designed and completed several years later by his grandson, Shoghi Effendi. In a separate room, the remains of ʻAbdu'l-Bahá were buried in November 1921.

In the early 20th century, Haifa began to emerge as an industrial port city and growing population center. A branch of the Hejaz railway, known as the Jezreel Valley railway, was built between 1903 and 1905. The railway increased the city's volume of trade, and attracted workers and foreign merchants. In 1912, construction began on the Technion Institute of Technology, a Jewish technical school that was to later become one of Israel's top universities, although studies did not begin until 1924. The Jews of Haifa also founded numerous factories and cultural institutions.

British Mandate

Haifa was captured from the Ottomans in September 1918 by Indian horsemen of the British Army armed with spears and swords who overran Ottoman positions. On 22 September, British troops were heading to Nazareth when a reconnaissance report was received indicating that the Turks were leaving Haifa. The British made preparations to enter the city and came under fire in the Balad al-Sheikh district (today Nesher). After the British regrouped, an elite unit of Indian horsemen were sent to attack the Turkish positions on the flanks and overrun their artillery guns on Mount Carmel.

Under the British Mandate, Haifa saw large-scale development and became an industrial port city. The Baháʼí Faith in 1918 and today has its administrative and spiritual centre in the environs of Haifa. Many Jewish immigrants of the Fourth Aliyah and Fifth Aliyah settled in Haifa. The port was a major source of income, and the nearby Jewish towns of the Krayot were established in the 1930s. At the same time, the Arab population also swelled by an influx of migrants, coming mainly from surrounding villages as well as the Syrian Hauran. The Arab immigration mainly came as a result of prices and salary drop. The 1922 census of Palestine, conducted by the British authorities, recorded Haifa as having a population of 9,377 Muslims, 8,863 Christians, 6,230 Jews, and 164 others. By the time of the 1931 census of Palestine, this had increased to 20,324 Muslims, 13,824 Christians, 15,923 Jews, and 332 others. Between the censuses of 1922 and 1931, the Muslim, Jewish, and Christian populations rose by 217%, 256%, and 156%, respectively. In 1938, 52,000 Jews and 51,000 Muslims and Christians lived in Haifa.

Haifa's development owed much to British plans to make it a central port and hub for Middle-East crude oil. The British Government of Palestine developed the port and built refineries, thereby facilitating the rapid development of the city as a center for the country's heavy industries. Haifa was also among the first towns to be fully electrified. The Palestine Electric Company inaugurated the Haifa Electrical Power Station already in 1925, opening the door to considerable industrialization. The State-run Palestine Railways also built its main workshops in Haifa.

By 1945 the population was 33% Muslim, 20% Christian and 47% Jewish. In 1947, about 70,910 Arabs (41,000 Muslims and 29,910 Christians) and 74,230 Jews were living there. The Christian community were mostly Greek-Melkite Catholics.

1947–1948 Civil War in Palestine

The 1947 UN Partition Plan in late November 1947 designated Haifa as part of the proposed Jewish state. Arab protests over that decision evolved into violence between Jews and Arabs that left several dozen people dead during December. The Arab city was in a state of chaos. The local Arab national committee tried to stabilize the situation by organizing garrison, calming the frightened residents and to stop the flight. In a public statement, the national committee called upon the Arab residents to obey orders, be alert, keep calm, and added: "Keep away the cowards who wish to flee. Expell them from your lines. Despise them, because they harm more than the enemy". Despite the efforts, Arab residents abandoned the streets which bordered Jewish neighborhoods and during the days of the general strike instigated by the Arab Higher Committee, some 250 Arab families abandoned the Khalisa neighborhood.

On 30 December 1947, members of the Irgun, a Jewish underground militia, threw bombs into a crowd of Arabs outside the gates of the Consolidated Refineries in Haifa, killing six and injuring 42. In response Arab employees of the company killed 39 Jewish employees in what became known as the Haifa Oil Refinery massacre. The Jewish Haganah militia retaliated with a raid on the Arab village of Balad al-Shaykh, where many of the Arab refinery workers lived, in what became known as the Balad al-Shaykh massacre.

British forces in Haifa redeployed on 21 April 1948, withdrawing from most of the city while still maintaining control over the port facilities. On the morning of 23 April the downtown, controlled by a combination of local and foreign (ALA) Arab irregulars, was assaulted by Jewish forces in Operation Bi'ur Hametz by the Carmeli Brigade of the Haganah, commanded by Moshe Carmel. Rashid al-Haj Ibrahim, a Palestinian Arab municipal leader, described the panic as being influenced by the 9 April 1948 Deir Yassin massacre.

The operation led to a massive displacement of Haifa's Arab population. According to The Economist at the time, only 5,000–6,000 of the city's 62,000 Arabs remained there by 2 October 1948.

Contemporaneous sources emphasized the Jewish leadership's attempt to stop the Arab exodus from the city and the Arab leadership as a motivating factor in the refugees' flight. According to the British district superintendent of police, "Every effort is being made by the Jews to persuade the Arab populace to stay and carry on with their normal lives, to get their shops and business open and to be assured that their lives and interests will be safe." Time magazine wrote on 3 May 1948: "The mass evacuation, prompted partly by fear, partly by orders of Arab leaders, left the Arab quarter of Haifa a ghost city. ... By withdrawing Arab workers their leaders hoped to paralyze Haifa."

Benny Morris said Haifa's Arabs left due to a combination of Zionist threats and encouragement to do so by Arab leaders. Ilan Pappé writes that the shelling culminated in an attack on a Palestinian crowd in the old marketplace using three-inch (76 mm) mortars on 22 April 1948. Shabtai Levy, the Mayor of the city, and some other Jewish leaders urged Arabs not to leave. According to Ilan Pappé, Jewish loudspeakers could be heard in the city ordering Arab residents to leave "before it's too late." Morris quotes British sources as stating that during the battles between 22 and 23 April 100 Arabs were killed and 100 wounded, but he adds that the total may have been higher.

State of Israel

After the Declaration of the Establishment of the State of Israel on 14 May 1948 Haifa became the gateway for Jewish immigration into Israel. During the 1948 Arab–Israeli War, the neighborhoods of Haifa were sometimes contested. After the war, Jewish immigrants were settled in new neighborhoods, among them Kiryat Hayim, Ramot Remez, Ramat Shaul, Kiryat Sprinzak, and Kiryat Eliezer. Bnei Zion Hospital (formerly Rothschild Hospital) and the Central Synagogue in Hadar Hacarmel date from this period. In 1953, a master plan was created for transportation and the future architectural layout. In 1959, a group of Sephardi and Mizrahi Jews, mostly Moroccan Jews, rioted in Wadi Salib, claiming the state was discriminating against them. Their demand for "bread and work" was directed at the state institutions and what they viewed as an Ashkenazi elite in the Labor Party and the Histadrut.

Tel Aviv gained in status, while Haifa suffered a decline in the role as regional capital. The opening of Ashdod as a port exacerbated this. Tourism shrank when the Israeli Ministry of Tourism placed emphasis on developing Tiberias as a tourist centre. Nevertheless, Haifa's population had reached 200,000 by the early 1970s, and mass immigration from the former Soviet Union boosted the population by a further 35,000. The Matam high-tech park, the first dedicated high-tech park in Israel, opened in Haifa in the 1970s. Many of Wadi Salib's historic Ottoman buildings have now been demolished, and in the 1990s a major section of the Old City was razed to make way for a new municipal center.

From 1999 to 2003, several Palestinian suicide attacks took place in Haifa (in Maxim and Matza restaurants, bus 37, and others), killing 68 civilians. In 2006, Haifa was hit by 93 Hezbollah rockets during the Second Lebanon War, killing 11 civilians and leading to half of the city's population fleeing at the end of the first week of the war. Among the places hit by rockets were a train depot and the oil refinery complex.

Demographics

Immigrants from the former Soviet Union constitute 25% of Haifa's population, thus making Russian one of the three main spoken languages of the city. According to the Israeli Central Bureau of Statistics, Israeli Arabs constitute 10% of Haifa's population, the majority living in Wadi Nisnas, Abbas and Khalisa neighborhoods. Wadi Nisnas and Abbas neighborhoods, are largely Christian, Khalisa and Kababir are largely Muslim, while Ein HaYam is a mixed Arab Christian and Muslim neighborhood. Haifa is commonly portrayed as a model of co-existence between Arabs and Jews, although tensions and hostility do still exist.

Between 1994 and 2009, the city had a declining and aging population compared to Tel Aviv and Jerusalem, as young people moved to the center of the country for education and jobs, while young families migrated to bedroom communities in the suburbs. However, as a result of new projects and improving infrastructure, the city managed to reverse its population decline, reducing emigration while attracting more internal migration into the city. In 2009, positive net immigration into the city was shown for the first time in 15 years.

A development plan approved in 2016 seeks to raise Haifa's population to 330,000 residents by 2025.

Religious and ethnic communities

The population is heterogeneous. Israeli Jews comprise some 82% of the population, almost 14% are Christians (the majority of whom are Arab Christians) and, some 4% are Muslims (of which 20% are Ahmadis). Haifa also includes Druze and Baháʼí Faith communities. In 2006, 27% of the Arab population was aged 14 and under, compared to 17% of the Jewish and other population groups. The trend continues in the age 15–29 group, in which 27% of the Arab population is found, and the age 30–44 group (23%). The population of Jews and others in these age groups are 22% and 18% respectively. Nineteen percent of the city's Jewish and other population is between 45 and 59, compared to 14% of the Arab population. This continues with 14% of Jews and others aged 60–74 and 10% over age 75, in comparison to 7% and just 2% respectively in the Arab population. Arabs in Haifa tend to be wealthier and better educated compare to other Arabs elsewhere in Israel. 

Haifa is home to the second-largest Arab Christian community in Israel, many of them lives in the Arabic-speaking neighborhoods in the lowlands near the sea; neighborhoods such as German Colony, Wadi Nisnas and Abbas, are largely Arab Christian. There are also a significant number of wealthy Christian Arabs in the Hadar West and Central. The Christian communities of Haifa are varied and included various denominations, the most prominent among them the Melkite Greek Catholic, followed by Greek Orthodox, Latin Catholics, Maronites, Armenian Orthodox, and Protestants. The Christian Arab communities in Haifa tend to be wealthier and better educated compare to other Arabs elsewhere in Israel. The Melkite Greek Catholic Archeparchy of Akka is based in Haifa, and its Cathedral episcopal see is St. Elijah Greek-Melkite Cathedral. 

Following Israel's withdrawal from Lebanon in 2000 some ex South Lebanon Army soldiers and officers who fled from Lebanon settled in Haifa with their families.

In 2006, 2.9% of the Jews in the city were Haredi, compared to 7.5% on a national scale. However, the Haredi community in Haifa is growing fast due to a high fertility rate. 66.6% were secular, compared to a national average of 43.7%. A significant portion of the immigrants from the former Soviet Union either lack official religious-ethnic classification or are Non-Jews as their mothers were not Jewish (Jewishness is passes down through the mother.) There is also a Scandinavian Seamen Protestant church, established by Norwegian Righteous Among the Nations pastor Per Faye-Hansen.

Haifa is the center of liberal Arabic-speaking culture, as it was under British colonial rule. The Arabic-speaking neighborhoods, which are mixed Muslim and Christian, are in the lowlands near the sea, while Jewish neighborhoods are at higher elevation. An active Arab cultural life has developed in the 21st century. The city is center of many Arab-owned businesses such as theaters, bars, cafes, restaurants and nightclubs which host also a different cultural discussions and art exhibitions.

Geography
Haifa is situated on the Israeli Mediterranean Coastal Plain, the historic land bridge between Europe, Africa, and Asia, and the mouth of the Kishon River. Located on the northern slopes of Mount Carmel and around Haifa Bay, the city is split over three tiers. The lowest is the center of commerce and industry including the Port of Haifa. The middle level is on the slopes of Mount Carmel and consists of older residential neighborhoods, while the upper level consists of modern neighborhoods looking over the lower tiers. From here views can be had across the Western Galilee region of Israel towards Rosh HaNikra and the Lebanese border.

Flora and fauna
The Carmel Mountain has three main wadis: Lotem, Amik and Si'ach. For the most part these valleys are undeveloped natural corridors that run up through the city from the coast to the top of the mountain. Marked hiking paths traverse these areas and they provide habitat for wildlife such as wild boar, golden jackal, hyrax, Egyptian mongoose, owls and chameleons.

Climate
Haifa has a hot-summer Mediterranean climate with hot, dry summers and mild, rainy winters (Köppen climate classification Csa). Spring arrives in March when temperatures begin to increase. By late May, the temperature has warmed up considerably to herald warm summer days. Snow is rare in Haifa, but temperatures around  can sometimes occur, usually in the early morning. Humidity tends to be high all year round, and rain usually occurs between September and May.

Neighborhoods

Haifa has developed in tiers, from the lower to the upper city on the Carmel. The oldest neighborhood in modern Haifa is Wadi Salib, the Old City center near the port, which has been bisected by a major road and razed in part to make way for government buildings. Wadi Salib stretches across to Wadi Nisnas, the center of Arab life in Haifa today. In the 19th century, under Ottoman rule, the German Colony was built, providing the first model of urban planning in Haifa. Some of the buildings have been restored and the colony has turned into a center of Haifa nightlife.

The first buildings in Hadar were constructed at the start of the 20th century. Hadar was Haifa's cultural center and marketplace throughout the 1920s and into the 1980s, nestled above and around Haifa's Arab neighborhoods. Today Hadar stretches from the port area near the bay, approximately halfway up Mount Carmel, around the German Colony, Wadi Nisnas and Wadi Salib. Hadar houses two commercial centers (one in the port area, and one midway up the mountain) surrounded by some of the city's older neighborhoods.

Neve Sha'anan, a neighborhood located on the second tier of Mount Carmel, was founded in the 1920s. West of the port are the neighborhoods of Bat Galim, Shikmona Beach, and Kiryat Eliezer. To the west and east of Hadar are the Arab neighborhoods of Abbas and Khalisa, built in the 1960s and 70s. To the south of Mount Carmel's headland, along the road to Tel Aviv, are the neighborhoods of Ein HaYam, Shaar HaAliya, Kiryat Sprinzak and Neve David.

Above Hadar are affluent neighborhoods such as the Carmel Tzarfati (French Carmel), Merkaz HaCarmel (Carmel Center), Romema (Ramot Ben Gurion), Ahuzat HaCarmel (Ahuza), Carmeliya, Vardiya, Ramat Golda, Ramat Alon and Hod Ha'Carmel (Denya). While there are general divisions between Arab and Jewish neighborhoods, there is an increasing trend for wealthy Arabs to move into affluent Jewish neighborhoods. Another Carmel neighborhood is Kababir, home to the National Headquarters of Israel's Ahmadiyya Community; located near Merkaz HaCarmel and overlooking the coast.

Urban development

In 2004, 80% of construction in the city was private.

Currently, the city has a modest number of skyscrapers and high-rise buildings. Though buildings rising up to 20 stories were built on Mount Carmel in the past, the Haifa municipality banned the construction of any new buildings taller than nine stories on Mount Carmel in July 2012.

The neighborhood of Wadi Salib, located in the heart of downtown Haifa, is being redeveloped. Most of its Jewish and Arab residents are considered squatters and have been gradually evicted over the years. The Haifa Economic Corporation Ltd is developing two 1,000 square meter lots for office and commercial use. Some historic buildings have been renovated and redeveloped, especially into nightclubs and theaters, such as the Palace of the Pasha, a Turkish bathhouse, and a Middle Eastern music and dance club, which has been converted into theaters and offices.

In 2012, a new, massive development plan was announced for Haifa's waterfront. According to the plan, the western section of the city's port will be torn down, and all port activity will be moved to the east. The west side of the port will be transformed into a tourism and nightlife center and a point of embarkation and arrival for sea travel through the construction of public spaces, a beach promenade, and the renovation of commercial buildings. The train tracks that currently bisect the city and separate the city's beach from the rest of Haifa will also be buried. A park will be developed on the border of the Kishon River, the refineries' cooling towers will be turned into a visitors' center, and bridges will lead from the port to the rest of the city. Massive renovations are also currently underway in Haifa's lower town, in the Turkish market and Paris Square, which will become the city's business center. In addition, the ammonia depository tank in the Haifa bay industrial zone will be dismantled, and a new one built in an alternative location.

Another plan seeks to turn the western section of Haifa Port into a major tourism and nightlife center, as well as a functioning point of embarkation and arrival for sea travel. All port activity will be moved to the western side, and the area will be redeveloped. Public spaces and a beach promenade will be developed, and commercial buildings will be renovated. As part of the development plans, the Israeli Navy, which has a large presence in Haifa, will withdraw from the shoreline between Bat Galim and Hof Hashaket. It will include a bicycle path, and possibly also a small bridge under which navy vessels will pass on their way to the sea.

In addition, a 50,000 square-meter entertainment complex that will contain a Disney theme park, cinemas, shops, and a 25-screen Multiplex theater will be built at the Check Post exit from the Carmel Tunnels. In 2014, a new major plan for the city was proposed, under which extensive development of residential, business, and leisure areas will take place with the target of increasing the city's population by 60,000 by 2025. Under the plan, five new neighborhoods will be built, along with new high-tech parks. In addition, existing employment centers will be renovated, and new leisure areas and a large park will be built.

In 2016, a new plan for the city was approved. The plan included a new main downtown business district, the creation of a park in a current industrial area, new construction and renovation of public buildings and hubs of higher education, tourism, culture, commerce, leisure, and residence.

Economy

The common Israeli saying, "Haifa works, Jerusalem prays, and Tel Aviv plays" attests to Haifa's reputation as a city of workers and industry. The industrial region of Haifa is in the eastern part of the city, around the Kishon River. It is home to the Haifa oil refinery, one of the two oil refineries in Israel (the other refinery being located in Ashdod). The Haifa refinery processes 9 million tons (66 million barrels) of crude oil a year. Its nowadays unused twin 80-meter high cooling towers, built in the 1930s, were the tallest buildings built in the British Mandate period. Matam (short for Merkaz Ta'asiyot Mada – Scientific Industries Center), the largest and oldest business park in Israel, is at the southern entrance to the city, hosting manufacturing and R&D facilities for a large number of Israeli and international hi-tech companies, such as Apple, Amazon, Abbot, Cadence, Intel, IBM, Magic Leap, Microsoft, Motorola, Google, Yahoo!, Elbit, CSR, Philips, PwC and Amdocs. The campus of the University of Haifa is also home to IBM Haifa Labs.

The Port of Haifa is the leader in passenger traffic among Israeli ports, and is also a major cargo harbor, although deregulation has seen its dominance challenged by the Port of Ashdod. Haifa malls and shopping centers include Hutsot Hamifratz, Horev Center Mall, Panorama Center, Castra Center, Colony Center (Lev HaMoshava), Hanevi'im Tower Mall, Kanyon Haifa, Lev Hamifratz Mall and Grand Kanyon. In 2010, Monocle magazine identified Haifa as the city with the most promising business potential, with the greatest investment opportunities in the world. The magazine noted that "a massive head-to-toe regeneration is starting to have an impact; from scaffolding and cranes around town, to renovated façades and new smart places to eat". The Haifa municipality had spent more than $350 million on roads and infrastructure, and the number of building permits had risen 83% in the previous two years.

In 2014, it was announced that a technology-focused stock exchange would be established to compete with the Tel Aviv Stock Exchange. Currently, some 40 hotels, mostly boutique hotels, are planned, have been approved, or are under construction. The Haifa Municipality is seeking to turn the city into Northern Israel's tourist center, from where travelers can embark on day trips into Acre, Nazareth, Tiberias, and the Galilee. A new life sciences industrial park containing five buildings with 85,000 square meters of space on a 31-duman (7.75 acre) site is being built adjacent to the Matam industrial park.

Tourism

In 2005, Haifa had 13 hotels with a total of 1,462 rooms. Haifa's main tourist attraction is the Baháʼí World Centre, with the golden-domed Shrine of the Báb and the surrounding gardens. Between 2005 and 2006, 86,037 visited the shrine. In 2008, the Baháʼí gardens were designated a UNESCO World Heritage Site. The restored German Colony, founded by the Templers, Stella Maris and Elijah's Cave also draw many tourists. Located in the Haifa district are the Ein Hod artists' colony, where over 90 artists and craftsmen have studios and exhibitions, and the Mount Carmel national park, with caves where Neanderthal and early Homo Sapiens remains were found.

A 2007 report commissioned by the Haifa Municipality calls for the construction of more hotels, a ferry line between Haifa, Acre and Caesarea, development of the western anchorage of the port as a recreation and entertainment area, and an expansion of the local airport and port to accommodate international travel and cruise ships.

Arts and culture

Despite its image as a port and industrial city, Haifa is the cultural hub of northern Israel. During the 1950s, mayor Abba Hushi made a special effort to encourage authors and poets to move to the city, and founded the Haifa Theatre, a repertory theater, the first municipal theater founded in the country. The principal Arabic theater servicing the northern Arab population is the al-Midan Theater. Other theaters in the city include the Krieger Centre for the Performing Arts and the Rappaport Art and Culture Center. The Congress Center hosts exhibitions, concerts and special events.

The New Haifa Symphony Orchestra, established in 1950, has more than 5,000 subscribers. In 2004, 49,000 people attended its concerts. The Haifa Cinematheque, founded in 1975, hosts the annual Haifa International Film Festival during the intermediate days of the Sukkot holiday. Haifa has 29 movie theaters. The city publishes a local newspaper, Yediot Haifa, and has its own radio station, Radio Haifa.רדיו חיפה - 107.5FM The Israeli Arabic-language newspapers Al-Ittihad and Al-Madina are also based in Haifa. During the 1990s, Haifa hosted the Haifa Rock & Blues Festival featuring Bob Dylan, Nick Cave, Blur and PJ Harvey. The last festival was held in 1995 with Sheryl Crow, Suede and Faith No More as headliners.

Museums

Haifa has over a dozen museums. The most popular museum is the Israel National Museum of Science, Technology, and Space, which recorded almost 150,000 visitors in 2004. The museum is located in the historic Technion building in the Hadar neighborhood. The Haifa Museum of Art houses a collection of modern and classical art, as well as displays on the history of Haifa. The Tikotin Museum of Japanese Art is the only museum in the Middle East dedicated solely to Japanese art. Other museums in Haifa include the Museum of Prehistory, the National Maritime Museum and Haifa City Museum, the Hecht Museum, the Dagon Archaeological Museum of Grain Handling, the Railway Museum, the Clandestine Immigration and Naval Museum, the Israeli Oil Industry Museum, and Chagall Artists' House. As part of his campaign to bring culture to Haifa, Mayor Abba Hushi provided the artist Mane-Katz with a building on Mount Carmel to house his collection of Judaica, which is now a museum. The former home and studio of artist Hermann Struck is now the Hermann Struck Museum. The Haifa Educational Zoo at Gan HaEm park houses a small animal collection including Syrian brown bears, now extinct from Israel. Wןthin the zoo is the Pinhas House biology institute. In the close vicinity of Haifa, on the Carmel, the Northern "Hai-Bar" ("wild life") operated by Israel's Parks and Reserves Authority for the purpose of breeding and reintroduction of species now extinct from Israel, such as Persian Fallow Deer.

Government
As an industrial port city, Haifa has traditionally been a Labor party stronghold. The strong presence of dock workers and trade unions earned it the nickname 'Red Haifa.' In addition, many prominent Arabs in the Israeli Communist Party, among them Tawfik Toubi, Emile Habibi, Zahi Karkabi, Bulus Farah and Emile Toma, were from Haifa.  There has been a drift toward the center. This was best signified by, in the 2006 legislative elections, the Kadima party receiving about 28.9% of the votes in Haifa, and Labor lagging behind with 16.9%. Before 1948, Haifa's Municipality was fairly unusual as it developed cooperation between the mixed Arab and Jewish community in the city, with representatives of both groups involved in the city's management. Under mayor al-Haj, between 1920 and 1927, the city council had six Arab and two Jewish representatives, with the city run as a mixed municipality with overall Arab control. Greater cooperation was introduced under Hasan Bey Shukri, who adopted a positive and conciliatory attitude toward the city's Jews and gave them senior posts in the municipality. In 1940, the first Jewish mayor, Shabtai Levy, was elected. Levy's two deputies were Arab (one Muslim, the other Christian), with the remainder of the council made up of four Jews and six Arabs.

Today, Haifa is governed by its 12th city council, headed by the mayor Einat Kalisch-Rotem. The results of municipal elections decide on the makeup of the council, similarly to the Knesset elections. The city council is the legislative council in the city, and has the authority to pass auxiliary laws. The 12th council, which was elected in 2003, has 31 members, with the liberal Shinui-Greens ticket holding the most seats (6), and Likud coming second with 5. Many of the decisions passed by the city council are results of recommendation made by the various municipal committees, which are committees where non-municipal organs meet with representatives from the city council. Some committees are spontaneous, but some are mandatory, such as the security committee, tender committee and financial committee.

Mayors

Najib Effendi al-Yasin (1873–77)
Ahmad Effendi Jalabi (1878–81)
Mustafa Bey al-Salih (1881–84)
Mustafa Pasha al-Khalil (1885–1903)
Jamil Sadiq (1904–10)
Rif'at al-Salah (1910–11)
Ibrahim al-Khalil (1911–13)
Abd al-Rahman al-Haj (1920–27)
Hassan Bey Shukri (1914–20, 1927–40)
Shabtai Levy (1940–51)
Abba Hushi (1951–1969)
Moshe Flimann (1969–1973)
Yosef Almogi (1974–1975)
Yeruham Zeisel (1975–1978)
Arie Gur'el (1978–1993)
Amram Mitzna (1993–2003)
Giora Fisher (interim mayor, 2003)
Yona Yahav (2003–2018)
Einat Kalisch-Rotem (2018–present)

Medical facilities

Haifa medical facilities have a total of 4,000 hospital beds. The largest hospital is the government-operated Rambam Hospital with 900 beds and 78,000 admissions in 2004. Bnai Zion Medical Center and Carmel Hospital each have 400 beds. Other hospitals in the city include the Italian Hospital, Elisha Hospital (100 beds), Horev Medical Center (36 beds) and Ramat Marpe (18 beds). Haifa has 20 family health centers. In 2004, there were a total of 177,478 hospital admissions. Rambam Medical Center was in the direct line of fire during the Second Lebanon War in 2006 and was forced to take special precautions to protect its patients. Whole wings of the hospital were moved to large underground shelters.

Education

Haifa is home to two internationally acclaimed universities and several colleges. The University of Haifa, founded in 1963, is at the top of Mt. Carmel. The campus was designed by the architect of Brasília and United Nations Headquarters in New York City, Oscar Niemeyer. The top floor of the 30-story Eshkol Tower provides a panoramic view of northern Israel. The Hecht Museum, with important archeology and art collections, is on the campus of Haifa University.

The Technion – Israel Institute of Technology, was founded in 1912, and became the first higher education institution where the language of teaching is Hebrew (see War of the Languages). It has 18 faculties and 42 research institutes. The original building now houses Israel National Museum of Science, Technology, and Space, also known as Madatech.

The Hebrew Reali School was founded in 1913. It is the largest k-12 school in Israel, with 4,000 students in 7 branches, all over the city.

The first technological high school in Israel, Bosmat, was established in Haifa in 1933. It was affiliated with the Technion. Because of financial difficulties, it was closed in 2007, and later re-established as part of the Mofet network, which was started by science teachers from the 1990s post-Soviet aliyah.

Other academic institutions in Haifa are the Gordon College of Education and Sha'anan Religious Teachers' College, the WIZO Haifa Academy of Design and Education, and Tiltan College of Design. The Michlala Leminhal College of Management and the Open University of Israel have branches in Haifa. The city also has a nursing college and the P.E.T Practical Engineering School.

Among Israeli higher education institutions the University of Haifa has the largest percentage (41%) of Arab-Israeli students. The Technion Israel Institute of Technology has the second largest percentage (22.2%) of Arab-Israeli students.

–07, Haifa had 70 elementary schools, 23 middle schools, 28 academic high schools and 8 vocational high schools. There were 5,133 pupils in municipal kindergartens, 20,081 in elementary schools, 7,911 in middle schools, 8,072 in academic high schools, 2,646 in vocational high schools, and 2,068 in comprehensive district high schools. 86% of the students attended Hebrew-speaking schools and 14% attended Arab schools. 5% were in special education. In 2004, Haifa had 16 municipal libraries stocking 367,323 books. Two prestigious Arab schools in Haifa are the Orthodox School, run by the Greek Orthodox church, and the Nazareth Nuns' School, a Catholic institution. About 70% of Arab students in Haifa (Christians, Muslims, and Druze) attend Christian schools (6 schools) that found in the city.

Transportation

Public transportation

Haifa is served by six railway stations and the Carmelit, currently Israel's only subway system (another is planned in Tel Aviv). The Nahariya–Tel Aviv Coastal Railway main line of Israel Railways runs along the coast of the Gulf of Haifa and has six stations within the city. From south-west to north-east, these stations are: Haifa Hof HaCarmel, Haifa Bat Galim, Haifa Merkaz HaShmona, HaMifrats Central, Hutzot HaMifratz and Kiryat Haim. Together with the Kiryat Motzkin Railway Station in the northern suburb Kiryat Motzkin, they form the Haifa – Krayot suburban line ("Parvarit"). There are direct trains from Haifa to Tel Aviv, Ben Gurion International Airport, Nahariya, Akko, Kiryat Motzkin, Binyamina, Lod, Ramla, Beit Shemesh, Jerusalem and other locations, but all trains to Beersheba skips all Haifa stations.

Haifa's intercity bus connections are operated almost exclusively by the Egged bus company, which operates two terminals:
HaMifratz Central Bus Station, adjacent to the HaMifrats Central Railway Station
Haifa Hof HaCarmel Central Bus Station, adjacent to the Hof HaCarmel Railway Station
Lines to the North of the country use HaMifratz Central Bus Station and their coverage includes most towns in the North of Israel. Lines heading south use Haifa Hof HaCarmel Central Bus Station. Destinations directly reachable from Hof HaCarmel CBS include Tel Aviv, Jerusalem, Eilat, Raanana, Netanya, Hadera, Zikhron Ya'akov, Atlit, Tirat Carmel, Ben Gurion International Airport and intermediate communities. There are also three Egged lines that have their terminus in the Ramat Vizhnitz neighborhood and run to Jerusalem, Bnei Brak and Ashdod. These used to be "mehadrin" (i.e. gender segregated) lines.

All urban lines are run by Egged. There are also share taxis that run along some bus routes but do not have an official schedule. In 2006, Haifa implemented a trial network of neighborhood mini-buses – named "Shkhunatit" and run by Egged. In December 2012, GetTaxi, an app and taxi service which allows users to hail a cab using their smartphone without contacting the taxi station (by identifying and summoning the closest taxi) began operating. In the current initial phase, 50 taxis from the service are operating in Haifa.

Haifa and the Krayot suburbs also have a new Phileas concept bus rapid transit system called the Metronit. These buses, operating with hybrid engines, follow optical strips embedded in designated lanes of roads, providing tram-like public transportation services. The Metronit consists of 100 18-meter buses, each with the capacity for 150 passengers, operating along  of designated roadways. The new system officially opened on 16 August 2013 serving three lines.

Haifa is one of the few cities in Israel where buses operate on Shabbat. Bus lines operate throughout the city on a reduced schedule from late Saturday morning onwards, and also connect Haifa with Nesher, Tirat Karmel, Yokneam, Nazareth, Nazareth Illit and intermediate communities. Since the summer of 2008, night buses are operated by Egged in Haifa (line 200) and the Krayot suburbs (line 210). During the summer of 2008 these lines operated 7 nights a week. Since 2013, along with route 1 of the Metronit, they operate 7 nights a week, making Haifa as the only city in Israel with 24/7 public transportation. Haifa is also the only city in Israel to operate a Saturday bus service to the beaches during summer time. Egged lines run during Saturday mornings from many neighborhoods to the Dado and Bat Galim beaches, and back in the afternoon.

The Haifa underground railway system is called Carmelit. It is a subterranean funicular on rails, running from downtown Paris Square to Gan HaEm (Mother's Park) on Mount Carmel. With a single track, six stations and two trains, it is listed in Guinness World Records as the world's shortest metro line. The Carmelit accommodates bicycles.

Haifa also has a cable car. The Haifa Cable Car gondola lift consists of six cabins and connects Bat Galim on the coast to the Stella Maris observation deck and monastery atop Mount Carmel. It serves mainly tourists.
There are currently plans to add a 4.4 kilometre commuter cable car service to Haifa's public transport system, running from HaMifratz Central Bus Station at the foot of Mount Carmel to the Technion, and then to the University of Haifa.

Air and sea transport
Haifa Airport serves domestic flights to Tel Aviv and Eilat as well as international charters to Cyprus, Greece and Jordan. The airliners that operate flights from Haifa are Arkia and Israir. There are currently plans to expand services from Haifa. Cruise ships operate from Haifa port primarily to destinations in the Eastern Mediterranean, Southern Europe and Black Sea.

Roads
Travel between Haifa and the center of the country is possible by road with Highway 2, the main highway along the coastal plain, beginning at Tel Aviv and ending at Haifa. Furthermore, Highway 4 runs along the coast to the north of Haifa, as well as south, inland from Highway 2. In the past, traffic along Highway 2 to the north of Haifa had to pass through the downtown area of the city. The Carmel Tunnels, opened for traffic 1 December 2010, now route this traffic under Mount Carmel, reducing congestion in the downtown area.

Sports

The main stadiums in Haifa are: Sammy Ofer Stadium, a UEFA-approved 30,858-seat stadium, completed in 2014, replacing the 14,002-seat Kiryat Eliezer Stadium that was demolished 2016, Thomas D'Alesandro Stadium and Neve Sha'anan Athletic Stadium that seats 1,000. The city's two main football clubs are Maccabi Haifa and Hapoel Haifa who both currently play in the Israeli Premier League and share the Sammy Ofer Stadium as their home pitch. Maccabi has won twelve Israeli titles, while Hapoel has won one.

Haifa has 4 professional basketball clubs. Hapoel Haifa and Maccabi Haifa both play in the Israeli Basketball Super League, the top division. They both also play at the Romema Arena, which seats 5,000.

Maccabi Haifa Woman plays in Israeli Female Basketball Premier League 1 division.

Hapoel Haifa Woman plays in the 3 division, the team plays at Kiryat Eliezer Arena.

The city also has an American football club, the Haifa Underdogs, that are a part of the Israeli Football League and play in Yoqneam Stadium. The team lost in the championship game of the league's inaugural season, but won one title as part of American Football Israel, which merged with the Israeli Football League in 2005. The city has several clubs in the regional leagues, including Beitar Haifa in Liga Bet (the fourth tier) and Hapoel Ahva Haifa, F.C. Haifa Ruby Shapira and Maccabi Neve Sha'anan Eldad in Liga Gimel (the fifth tier). The Haifa Hawks are an ice hockey team based out of the city of Haifa. They participate in the Israeli League, the top level of Israeli ice hockey. In 1996, the city hosted the World Windsurfing Championship. The Haifa Tennis Club, near the southwest entrance to the city, is one of the largest in Israel. John Shecter, Olympic horse breeder and owner of triple cup champion Shergar was born here.

Notable people

Abed Abdi (born 1942), Arab Palestinian painter and sculptor
Orr Barouch (born 1991), footballer
Naftali Bennett (born 1972), politician
Aaron Ciechanover (born 1947), biologist; Nobel Prize, Chemistry
Jonathan Erlich (born 1977), tennis player
Ari Folman (born 1962), filmmaker, creator of Waltz with Bashir
Anastasia Gorbenko (born 2003), swimmer
Lea Gottlieb (1918–2012), founder and fashion designer of Gottex
Avram Hershko (born 1937), biochemist, 2004 Nobel Prize, Chemistry
Jonatan Kopelev (born 1991), swimmer
Shiri Maimon (born 1981), Hebrew singer, represented Israel in Eurovision 2005
Shahar Perkiss (born 1962), tennis player
Yehuda Poliker (born 1950), Hebrew songwriter and folk singer
Odeya Rush (born 1997), Hollywood actress and model
Yulia Sachkov (born 1999), world champion kickboxer
Gene Simmons (born 1949), musician
Josef Singer (1923–2009), President of Technion – Israel Institute of Technology
Uri Sivan (born 1955), physicist, professor, and President of the Technion – Israel Institute of Technology
Hillel Slovak (1962–1988), founding guitarist of the Red Hot Chili Peppers
Lior Suchard (born 1981), Mentalist or Mind Reader
Avi Wigderson (born 1956), mathematician and computer scientist, recipient of the 2021 Abel Prize

Twin towns – sister cities

Haifa is twinned with:

 Marseille, France (1962)
 Portsmouth, United Kingdom (1962)
 Hackney, United Kingdom (1968)
 Manila, Philippines (1971)
 San Francisco, United States (1973)
 Aalborg, Denmark (1973)
 Cape Town, South Africa (1975)
 Bremen, Germany (1978)
 Newcastle upon Tyne, United Kingdom (1979)
 Antwerp, Belgium (1986)
 Mainz, Germany (1987)
 Düsseldorf, Germany (1988)
 Rosario, Argentina (1988)
 Odessa, Ukraine (1992)
 Shanghai, China (1994)
 Limassol, Cyprus (2000)
 Fort Lauderdale, United States (2002)
 Erfurt, Germany (2005)
 Mannheim, Germany (2005)
 Shenzhen, China (2012)
 Chengdu, China (2013)
 Shantou, China (2015)

See also
Haifa Pride
List of people from Haifa
Wikimania 2011
List of clock towers - Haifa has an Ottoman clock tower next to the El-Jarina Mosque and the Saraya (government house), inaugurated c. 1898-1900

References

Further reading

External links

City of Haifa

Haifa
Arab Christian communities in Israel
Crusader castles
Castles and fortifications of the Kingdom of Jerusalem
Castles in Israel
Cities in Haifa District
Cities in Israel
Baha'i holy cities
Mediterranean port cities and towns in Israel
Mixed Israeli communities
Phoenician cities
Populated places established in the 1st century
Ottoman clock towers
Clock towers in Israel